Christopher Paul Phillipson (born 10 February 1952 in Vrindaban, India) is a retired cricketer who played first-class cricket for Sussex County Cricket Club. 

He was educated at Ardingly College, and went on to play 168 times for Sussex between 1970 and 1986.

References

External links
Career statistics - Paul Phillipson

1952 births
Living people
People educated at Ardingly College
English cricketers
Sussex cricketers